Cináed is a Goidelic language male name, probably derived from the Brythonic language name Ciniod. The hypocoristic form may have been Cinadon. It is represented by the later Scottish name Kenneth and is not derived from the common Gaelic name Áed. It might refer to:

 Cinioch, son of Luchtren, (died 630s), King of the Picts
 Cináed mac Írgalaig (died 728), High King of Ireland
 Ciniod I of the Picts, son of Wrad, (died 775), King of the Picts
 Ciniod II of the Picts, son of Wrad son of Bargoit, (floruit circa 842), King of the Picts
 Cináed mac Conaing (died 851), king of Brega
 Cináed mac Ailpín (died 858), King of the Picts, aka Kenneth MacAlpin or Kenneth I of Scotland
 Cináed Ua Hartacáin (died 975), poet
 Cináed mac Maíl Coluim (died 995), King of Alba
 Cináed mac Duib (died 1005), King of Alba

Etymology 
The name Cináed originates with the Pictish name Ciniod. Although the Cin- element is uncertain, the -iod element may conserve Proto-Celtic *jʉ:ð, meaning "lord" (c.f. Welsh Maredudd).

References 

Gaelic-language given names